

Hardy  is a locality in the Australian state of South Australia located about  north of the state capital of Adelaide and about  east of the municipal seat in Peterborough.

Hardy’s boundaries were created on 31 August 2000 for the “local established name” which is derived from the cadastral unit of the Hundred of Hardy.  On 26 April 2013, a portion on its eastern side was added to the new locality of Warnes with the result that all of its boundaries now align with those of the Hundred of Hardy.

Land use within the locality is ’primary production’ and is concerned with “agricultural production and the grazing of stock on relatively large holdings.”

The 2016 Australian census which was conducted in August 2016 reports that Hardy had no people living within its boundaries.

Hardy is located within the federal division of Grey, the state electoral district of Stuart and the local government area of the District Council of Peterborough.

References

Towns in South Australia